FIM JuniorGP World Championship is a junior class race event organized by Dorna Sports under FIM regulations. It runs under Moto3 regulations and acts as an Moto3 World Championship feeder.

Motorcycle specifications 
European Talent Cup uses the One Make Bike system so that all racers will use the same motorcycle

Sponsor
 Repsol
 HRC
 Dell'Orto
 Red Bull
 Dunlop
 Alpinestars
 Prosesco Doc
 Hawkers
 Bridgestone

Champions
 2012 :  Álex Márquez
 2013 :  Fabio Quartararo
 2014 :  Fabio Quartararo
 2015 :  Nicolò Bulega
 2016 :  Lorenzo Dalla Porta
 2017 :  Dennis Foggia
 2018 :  Raúl Fernández
 2019 :  Jeremy Alcoba
 2020 :  Izan Guevara
 2021 :  Daniel Holgado
 2022 :  José Antonio Rueda

References

Grand Prix motorcycle racing
FIM CEV Moto3 Junior World Championship
Motorcycle road racing series
motorcycle sport
Sport in Europe